The 1912 All England Open Badminton Championships was a badminton tournament held at the Royal Horticultural Hall, Westminster, England from February 27 to March 3, 1912.

Frank Chesterton regained his men's singles title after missing the 1911 Championships. Former women's champion Ethel Thomson returned as Mrs Larcombe after several years absence and reached the singles before being beaten by the defending champion Margaret Tragett (also playing under her new married name).

Henry Norman Marrett played under the name A. N. Other.

Final results

Men's singles

Women's singles

Men's doubles

Women's doubles

Mixed doubles
In the first round Fitton & Radeglia defeated W. B. Bayne & Mrs Harvey 15–13, 15-7

References

All England Open Badminton Championships
All England
All England Championships
All England Open Badminton Championships in London
All England Badminton Championships
All England Badminton Championships
All England Badminton Championships